Yesenia Yarhui Albino (born 16 August 1995) is a Bolivian lawyer, politician, and former student leader who served as a party-list member of the Chamber of Deputies from Chuquisaca from 2015 to 2020. An activist forged in the student movement, Yarhui entered politics in 2014 as a candidate on the Christian Democratic Party ballot. Elected in that year's general elections, Yarhui was just 19 years old upon her entry into the Chamber of Deputies, making her the youngest parliamentarian in Bolivian history.

Early life 
Yesenia Yarhui was born on 16 August 1995 in Sucre. Yarhui's political trajectory began as a member of Chuquisaca's student movement; she served as secretary of conflicts in the Chuquisaca Students' Federation and was a youth representative before the Unified Syndical Confederation of Rural Workers of Bolivia. Yarhui attended the University of San Francisco Xavier, during which time she served as a member of its Faculty of Law's Scientific and Research Society, later graduating with a bachelor of laws and political and social sciences.

Chamber of Deputies

Election 

In 2014, Yarhui was invited by the Christian Democratic Party (PDC) to be a candidate for a seat in the Chamber of Deputies in that year's general elections. Yarhui's accession to the party's electoral list had been suggested by her aunt, Tomasa Yarhui, a Quechua peasant leader running as the PDC's vice-presidential candidate. Though the family connection was questioned by critics, Tomasa Yarhui assured that Yesenia's selection was an opportunity for young leaders to participate in politics.

Tenure 
Elected at the tail end of 2014, Yarhui assumed office on 18 January 2015. Aged 19 years, 5 months, and 2 days old at the time of her assumption, Yarhui became the youngest parliamentarian in Bolivian history, as well as the youngest legislator in Latin America. Her ability to assume the position was made possible by the passage of the 2009 Constitution, which reduced age requirements to hold office in the Legislative Assembly. Yarhui's status as the country's youngest legislator was a central pillar of her tenure in the Chamber of Deputies, one she used to promote the participation of youth and women in politics. In an interview with the nonprofit Women's Coordination Committee, Yarhui outlined the need to do away with the "cultural stigmatization of being young and female" so as to ensure that those groups "can be taken into account as true protagonists in decision-making". Regarding her experience as a legislator, Yarhui recalled facing mistrust from her colleagues, including from within her own caucus, for "supposedly not having the capacity [to legislate]". However, she assured that that difficulty lessened with time, and in 2019, she even attained significant support from some of her colleagues to contest the leadership of the PDC caucus, nearly winning the election.

Commission assignments 
 Planning, Economic Policy, and Finance Commission
 Mining and Metallurgy Committee (–)
 Planning, Economic Policy, and Finance Commission
 Budget, Tax Policy, and Comptroller's Office Committee (–)
 Plural Justice, Prosecutor's Office, and Legal Defense of the State Commission
 Ordinary Jurisdiction and Magistracy Council Committee (–)

Later political career 
Nearing the end of her service in the Chamber of Deputies, Yarhui expressed an interest in continuing her burgeoning career in politics. Just over a year after leaving office, Yarhui was sworn into the second cabinet of Damián Condori, the governor of Chuquisaca. She was appointed to serve as departmental secretary of culture, tourism, productive development, and employment, a broad-ranging position brought about by the merger of the Secretariat of Productive Development with the Directorate of Culture as a measure of economic austerity. She held the post for just one year before being replaced during Condori's annual cabinet reshuffle.

Electoral history

References

Notes

Footnotes

Bibliography

External links 
 Deputies profile Vice Presidency .
 Deputies profile Chamber of Deputies . Archived from the original on 12 August 2020.

1995 births
Living people
21st-century Bolivian lawyers
21st-century Bolivian politicians
21st-century women lawyers
21st-century Bolivian women politicians
Bolivian people of Quechua descent
Bolivian student activists
Bolivian women lawyers
Christian Democratic Party (Bolivia) politicians
Members of the Bolivian Chamber of Deputies from Chuquisaca
People from Sucre
University of Saint Francis Xavier alumni
Women members of the Chamber of Deputies (Bolivia)